Pawan Sarraf (born 17 December 2000) is a Nepalese cricketer. He made his One Day International (ODI) debut for Nepal against the United Arab Emirates on 25 January 2019.

In January 2019, he was named in Nepal's Twenty20 International (T20I) squad for their series against the United Arab Emirates. He made his T20I debut for Nepal against the United Arab Emirates on 1 February 2019. In April 2019, he was named in Nepal's squad for the Asia qualification tournament for the 2020 Under-19 Cricket World Cup. In Nepal's opening match of the tournament, against Singapore, Sarraf took three wickets for five runs and was named the player of the match.

In June 2019, he was named in Nepal's squad for the Regional Finals of the 2018–19 ICC T20 World Cup Asia Qualifier tournament. He made his first-class debut on 6 November 2019, for Nepal against the Marylebone Cricket Club (MCC), during the MCC's tour of Nepal. Later the same month, he was named in Nepal's squads for the 2019 ACC Emerging Teams Asia Cup in Bangladesh, and for the men's cricket tournament at the 2019 South Asian Games. The Nepal team won the bronze medal, after they beat the Maldives by five wickets in the third-place playoff match. In September 2020, he was one of eighteen cricketers to be awarded with a central contract by the Cricket Association of Nepal.

References

External links
 

2000 births
Living people
Nepalese cricketers
Nepal One Day International cricketers
Nepal Twenty20 International cricketers
People from Bara District
South Asian Games bronze medalists for Nepal
South Asian Games medalists in cricket